Antop Hill is a neighbourhood in Mumbai to the east of the Harbour railway line. It derives its name from a local Marathi owner called Antoba. In course of time the name was anglicised to "Antop". To the south is MBPT (Mumbai Port Trust Colony) and to the north is the C.G.S. colony. To the east at a distance lies the Trombay Hill and the RCF Factory.

Antop Hill is well known for the Central Govt. Housing Colony. The Housing Colony came up in the late 1950s and caters mainly to housing government employees working in Customs, Income Tax, Indian navy, Sales Tax, and other central government departments. The Kings circle station in Harbour line. The Antop Hill is very close to Harbor Line - G.T.B.Nagar (2 km), Wadala Road (2.5 km) Central Line - Sion (3 km), and Dadar, this place is accessible to all the railway's lines in Mumbai. It also has excellent B.E.S.T. bus connectivity to all parts of Mumbai. Antop Hill has also connectivity with India's first "Monorail" which starts from Chembur to Sant Gadge Maharaj Chowk.

Antop Hill starts from the Northern part i.e. Kokari Agar Road near Antop Hill Church. The Southern end of Antop Hill has the Famous Barkat Ali Dargah overlooking the Nana Phadnavis Flyover. The central section of the hill has the Indian Oil Depot that rations out kerosene. Every morning hordes of bullock carts ferry kerosene across to the poor areas of Mumbai from this depot.

The area around the oil depot has some interesting cemeteries (Chinese, Baháʼí, Sunni Muslim, Brahma Samaj and European). The New Link road cuts the hill into two parts. The Northern Section has the four Walchand Bungalows, which are about a century old. Just below the bungalows on the Eastern side was the factory of Indian Hume Pipes, owned by the Walchand family, that has now been converted into a swanky housing area called Dosti Acres. On the Western side is the brand new Patent & Trademarks Office. The southernmost wooden part of this hill has the Haji Allana Muslim Sanatorium with a magnificent entrance. Between sanatorium and the C.G.S. Colony are the ancient Dargahs of Bhatkali Shah and Sheikh Misri, It is known as Sheikh Misri Dargha is of the saint who migrated from Egypt then Misr. Opposite this Dargah is the Antop Hill bus depot of B.E.S.T.

Beyond the Dosti Housing complex, further eastward are the twin towers (as of 2006) of Llyods Estate. Right next to the Lloyd Estate is the Vidyalankar Institute of Technology (VIT) run by the Vidyalankar group. The engineering college started in 1999 and shifted to its current location around 2000–2001.

Many parts of Antop Hill are occupied by slums. Around this area is the Sangam Nagar slum. The Darul-Salam High School which is recognized by the Government of Maharashtra State is located here. This organization also conducts the Mahatma Phule Hami Yojna (Sarva Shiksha Abhiyan) classes for children from slums who are unable to attend a school or are school drop-outs. This place also got in headlines when Enforcement Directorate (ED) arrested Omkar Group chairman Kamal Kishor Gupta and managing director Babulal Varma on Wednesday in a Rs 410 crore money laundering case linked to a slum redevelopment project.

Antop Hill Police station is located in Sector 6 of C.G.S. Colony. Behind the Police station, there is Ground to play for the people usually you will find this ground full during Sundays and schools/colleges vacation with people playing cricket.

Notes

Neighbourhoods in Mumbai